Heinz Mertel (born 19 July 1936) is a German former sport shooter. He competed in the 50 m pistol event at the 1968, 1972 and 1976 Summer Olympics, and finished in second, sixteen and fourth place, respectively.

References

1936 births
Living people
German male sport shooters
ISSF pistol shooters
Olympic shooters of West Germany
Shooters at the 1968 Summer Olympics
Shooters at the 1972 Summer Olympics
Shooters at the 1976 Summer Olympics
Olympic silver medalists for West Germany
Olympic medalists in shooting
Medalists at the 1968 Summer Olympics
Sportspeople from Nuremberg